The 31st Marine Expeditionary Unit (31st MEU) is one of seven Marine Expeditionary Units in existence in the United States Marine Corps. The Marine Expeditionary Unit is a Marine Air Ground Task Force with a strength of about 2,200 Marines and sailors. The 31st MEU consists of a company-sized command element, a battalion landing team (BLT), (an infantry battalion reinforced with artillery, amphibious vehicles and other attachments), a medium tiltrotor squadron (reinforced), (which includes detachments of short take-off, vertical landing airplanes and heavy, light, and attack helicopters), and a combat logistics battalion. The 31st MEU is based at Camp Hansen, Marine Corps Base Camp Smedley D. Butler, Okinawa, Japan.  The 31st MEU is the only permanently forward-deployed MEU, and provides a flexible and lethal force ready to perform a wide range of military, humanitarian, and diplomatic operations as the premier crisis response force in the Indo-Pacific region.

Current subordinate units
Ground Combat Element: Battalion Landing Team 1st Battalion, 5th Marines
Aviation Combat Element: VMM-262 (Reinforced)
Logistics Combat Element: Combat Logistics Battalion 31

History

Vietnam War
The 31st Marine Expeditionary Unit was activated on 1 March 1967 as Special Landing Force Alpha, for operations in Vietnam. It made the first of many amphibious deployments from Okinawa to the coast of Vietnam on 10 April 1967.

The first operation actually conducted was on 14 April 1967, when the MEU conducted a rescue of the crew of the SS Silver Peak, a Panamanian vessel run aground by Typhoon Violet, in vicinity of Minami Ko Shima Island, Japan.

Days later, it was committed to Operation Union, a search and destroy mission in Vietnam.

It was during this period of intense combat that Special Landing Force Alpha earned the Presidential Unit Citation. The unit participated in continuing combat operations ashore over the next three years, including the Vietnam Tet counteroffensive in 1969, while returning to Okinawa periodically for re-outfitting and the rotation of forces.

Special Landing Force Alpha was officially designated as the 31st Marine Amphibious Unit (MAU) on 24 November 1970. Once more the unit returned to the Gulf of Tonkin. This time, however, the 31st MAU would not be committed to overt land operations as the Vietnam War was winding down. The 31st MAU performed presence missions and conducted a series of special operations through May 1971. From June 1971 until April 1975, the 31st MAU conducted many deployments to the waters off Vietnam.

The 31st MAU was then directed to the Gulf of Thailand for Operation Eagle Pull, the American Embassy evacuation by air of Phnom Penh, Cambodia, which took place on 12 April 1975.

This was followed by the 31st MAU's participation in Operation Frequent Wind on 29 April 1975 which was the final evacuation of Saigon as North Vietnamese forces entered the city.

1980s and 1990s
The 31st MEU at this time was established as the only permanently forward-deployed U.S. presence in the Western Pacific, Southern Pacific, and Indian Ocean with Special Operations capabilities to routinely include a port call at Mombasa Kenya. Other stops could include Diego Garcia, Perth, Olongapo, or Busan. In February 1980 the USS Okinawa (LPH-3) task force, already with Marine Cobra and Harrier attack aircraft from California, made port at Pearl Harbor to take aboard the final elements of the MEU which consisted of 3rd Battalion/ 3rd Marines, Helicopter assets of MAG24, Force Recon, and MSSG-31 in support, all out of Kaneohe Bay's 1st Marine Brigade. On 24 April this group in support of 3/3 Marines rendezvoused with USS Nimitz off the coast of Iran as reserve in the ill-fated Operation Eagle Claw. Okinawa carried 4 each Cobras and Harriers, along with Sea Knights and Sea Stallions. All members of the 31st received respective expeditionary medals.   The frigate USS Barbey and guided missile cruiser Gridley served as escorts.

Combat operations were replaced by regional exercises, which allowed training opportunities in a variety of countries.
During the late 1970s and early 1980s, the 31st MEU engaged in humanitarian operations, for example the floods in Bangladesh (1984). In 1983, the 31st MEU was recalled from a combined exercise with local forces in Kenya, and positioned in the Mediterranean Sea. Its mission from September to October 1983 was to support the Multinational U.S. peacekeeping forces in Beirut during an intense period of complex political and life-threatening conditions in Lebanon. They took over the command operations after their sister unit (24th MEU) was attacked in the Beirut bombing. It was the 31st MEU's last military operation of that period and the unit was deactivated in May 1985 on ship off the shore of San Diego.  During this time the 31st MEU was based at the Marine Barracks, Subic Bay Naval Station.

The unit was reactivated as the 31st Marine Expeditionary Unit (Special Operations Capable) on 9 September 1992. In 1994, the unit was relocated to its current home station at Camp Hansen, in Okinawa, Japan.

Iraq 1998-99
The flexibility of the MEU was demonstrated with the Iraq crisis in late 1998 regarding the regime not complying with the U.N. weapons inspections process. All four ARG ships had just completed Exercise Foal Eagle off the coast of Korea, and were heading to various port visits for liberty, when each ship received the call in early Nov 1998 to sail immediately to Okinawa to onload the 31st MEU.

A significant portion of the 31st MEU's 2000 Marines were engaged in urban warfare training in Guam when their message to return to Okinawa came in November. The rest were still in Okinawa, but approximately a quarter of those were a new infantry battalion, just rotating in from California. The battalion had just two days to gather all their personnel to get ready to deploy.

The 31st MEU and ships' company personnel started their initial onloads to the ships on 9 November and completed the morning of 11 Nov. In one night alone, they loaded more than 170 pallets of equipment, weapons, and cargo. In addition, a C-5 Galaxy from Marine Corps Air Station El Toro, originally scheduled to bring maintenance supplies and tools to Okinawa two weeks later, arrived early on 10 November 1998 in order to restock the MEU's Air Combat Element. This evolution was a part of the normal supply rotation, but the shipment arrived a week early – just in time to load onto the ships before they departed.

From Nov 1998 to Feb 1999, the MEU participated in operations in the Persian Gulf and off the coast of Kuwait, including Operation Southern Watch and Operation Desert Fox.

East Timor
Marines of 31 MEU (SOC) deployed with Amphibious Squadron Eleven (PhibRon 11) to support Australian Defence Force (ADF) operations in East Timor in September 1999 until November of that same year.   The Air Combat Element (ACE) and portions of the Battalion Landing Team (BLT) supported East Timor operations and the ACE supported the ground operations of the ADF.  The Marines and sailors were embarked aboard the Amphibious Assault Ship USS Belleau Wood (LHA-3) and conducted "lily pad" operations all around East Timor using the ship's large flight deck as a staging and refueling platform for Allied air operations in support of International Forces East Timor (INTERFET) commanded by the ADF contingent Commander of those operations Major General Peter Cosgrove, Australian Army.

US Forces portions of the MEU, including Golf Company, 2nd Battalion, 5th Marines and Charlie Company 1st Battalion 5th Marines, then the MEU's Battalion Landing Team; portions of the Command Element; and HMM-265, the MEU's Air Combat Element; and MEU Service Support Group 31 deployed to East Timor in January 2000 aboard  as Special Purpose Marine Air Ground Task Force East Timor. In East Timor, the Marines and Sailors supported the transition from the Australian-led International Forces in East Timor (INTERFET) to the new United Nations Transitional Administration East Timor (UNTAET).

9-11
On 12 September 2001, which was 11 September on the East Coast, the Marines of the 31st MEU's Battalion Landing Team 2nd Battalion 5th Marines (BLT 2/5) were secured in their barracks on Camp Hansen as a Super Typhoon was passing over Okinawa, Japan.  Marines became aware of the September 11 attacks through the Armed Forces Network television and radio stations, and word quickly spread.  That evening the 31st MEU received a 96-hour warning order for deployment and was notified that the Navy ships were en route to load as quickly as possible. Although the storm was still in progress, Marines prepared their personal gear, plans were made, and vehicles and equipment were quickly moved to the port facility and onto the ships.  The helicopter squadron was the last to board due to the passing storm, and the on-load was successfully completed in 93 hours.  The 31st MEU then steamed south towards their anticipated destination, Afghanistan.  As the ships passed Singapore, their destination was changed to East Timor.  There the MEU again supported UNTAET operations.  It was later found out that the 15th Marine Expeditionary Unit, just returning from a deployment to East Timor, was assigned the task of heading to Afghanistan.

21st century

From September 2004 to March 2005, the 31st MEU, including Battalion Landing Team 1st Battalion 3rd Marines with attached Charlie Battery of 1st Battalion 12th Marines, conducted combat actions during the Iraq War.  Participation included a major role in Operation Phantom Fury, the clearing of Fallujah in November 2004.

With organizational changes to Marine Corps' reconnaissance units in 2006, all the MEU's Special Operations Capable (SOC) designations were removed. The 31st MEU then became titled as a Maritime Contingency Force, although it remains capable of conducting the same wide variety of specialized missions on both sea and land.

In February 2006, the 31st MEU was sent to the Philippines to provide relief assistance during the mudslides in southern Leyte.

On 21 September 2007, the 31st MEU Command Element dedicated its headquarters building at Camp Hansen, Okinawa to Sergeant Rafael Peralta, who died in Iraq during Operation Phantom Fury while assigned to the 31st MEU BLT 1/3 Alpha Company 1st Platoon.  Sgt Peralta received the Navy Cross for his actions in Fallujah.

In May and June 2008, the MEU participated in Operation Caring Response after Cyclone Nargis hit Myanmar.

In October 2009 the MEU assisted in humanitarian & disaster relief in Luzon, Philippines after Typhoons Ketsana and Parma hit back to back.  Simultaneously, elements of the MEU assisted in Sumatra, Indonesia after earthquakes struck the region.

In October 2010, the 31st MEU conducted humanitarian assistance and disaster relief operations in northern Luzon after Super Typhoon Megi hit the Philippines.

Operation Tomodachi, Japan - 2011
The 31st MEU was split into three separate parts on 11 March 2011, the day of the 9.0 earthquake and tsunami. The largest ship, with most of the Marines and Sailors of the 31st MEU aboard, had just completed an exercise in Cambodia and had arrived in Malaysia for a port visit. When 31st MEU leadership received news of the tsunami, they initiated an immediate recall of all personnel who were away from the ship on liberty.

Germantown and Harpers Ferry were both in Indonesia with elements of the 31st MEU embarked, and marines and sailors aboard the USS Harpers Ferry were scheduled to participate in a large humanitarian assistance and disaster relief exercise starting 12 March.  Both ships were immediately alerted upon news of the disaster in Japan and headed north for the stricken country in support of what would become Operation Tomodachi.

The Essex Amphibious Ready Group and the 31st MEU first arrived off the coast of Akita, Japan, 17 March and began flying coastal surveillance flights in the initial stages of Operation Tomodachi. Then, on 22 March, the ARG repositioned off the east coast of Japan, near Hachinohe, and the 31st MEU immediately began delivering relief supplies ashore via helicopters of Marine Medium Helicopter Squadron 262 (Reinforced). Supplies delivered included water, blankets, and other health and comfort items. HMM-262 (REIN) conducted a total of 15 survey missions and 204 supply delivery missions with nearly 300 hours of flight time.

On 27 March, the MEU and Essex ARG's priority became support to the isolated island of Oshima as part of Operation Tomodachi. Elements of the 31st MEU, including Marine Medium Helicopter Squadron 262 (Reinforced), Combat Logistics Battalion 31, 2nd Battalion 5th Marines and the command element went ashore on Oshima Island to remove debris, deliver critical supplies to the isolated area, and provide life support.

Combat Logistics Battalion 31 began by transporting relief supplies, which included moving commercial electric utility vehicles, a fuel truck, a water re-supply vehicle and civilian workers from the Tohoku Power Company by U.S. Navy landing craft to attempt to restore partial power to the cut-off island.  The same day the utility vehicles were delivered, the island received power for the first time since the disaster.

During the Oshima operation, pallets of clothes, blankets, and food were flown to the JMSDF helicopter destroyer JS Hyuga (DDH 181) by Marine helicopters, where they were distributed to displaced residents of the island who were temporarily embarked aboard the ship.

Working alongside the JGSDF, the 31st MEU delivered 15,000 pounds of supplies to the island and cleared tons of debris from harbors, roads and beaches. Marines also created temporary shower facilities allowing residents to bathe. For some it was the first time they had been able to take a shower since the tsunami struck.

In total, the 31st MEU and the Essex ARG moved 164,000 pounds of relief supplies to those affected by the disaster, including five cities, Oshima Island and the Japanese ship.

Typhoon Haiyan and Operation Damayan - 2013
In November 2013, the 31st MEU acted as a contingency reserve in wake of Typhoon Haiyan in the Republic of the Philippines.  The MEU was conducting unit turnover when they were tasked to respond and quickly embarked aboard the USS Ashland (LSD 48) and USS Germantown (LSD 42) of Amphibious Squadron 11 to assist in disaster relief operations in conjunction with the U.S. Department of State and Joint Task Force 505.  The Aviation Combat Element of the 31st MEU, Marine Medium Tiltrotor Squadron 265, flew over 415 flight hours to deliver aid supplies throughout the region.  The rest of the MEU remained at sea in the Leyete Gulf of the Philippines to act as a contingency reserve in the event any more assistance was needed or another disaster were to strike the area.

South Korean ferry Sewol - 2014
In April 2014, the 31st MEU on board the USS Bonhomme Richard assisted in air-sea search and rescue operations of the Korean ferry Sewol that "sank near the island of Jindo off the southwestern coast of the Republic of Korea 16 April".

Typhoon Soudelor, Saipan - 2015
From 2–3 August 2015, Typhoon Soudelor devastated the island of Saipan in the Commonwealth of Northern Mariana Islands. Approximately 600 Marines and sailors of the 31st MEU responded to assist local and federal agencies with disaster relief efforts. Over the course of two weeks, the 31st MEU delivered more than 19,000 gallons of water and 47,000 individual meals provided by the Federal Emergency Management Agency to five distribution sites across the island. The Marines distributed an additional 366,000 gallons of potable water to the people of Saipan, 279,000 gallons of which were purified using a Lightweight Water Purification System and a Tactical Water Purification System. The 31st MEU also distribute more than 10,000 pounds of emergency supplies provided by the Red Cross.

Operation Chinzei, Japan - 2016
From 15–17 April 2016, a series of earthquakes struck the Japanese prefecture of Kumamoto, causing 48 deaths and displacing some 100,000 people. At the request of the Government of Japan, approximately 130 Marines and Sailors of the 31st MEU provided support to operations conducted by Joint Task Force Chinzei, led by the Japan Self-Defense Force. From 18–23 April, 31st MEU MV-22B Ospreys operating out of Marine Corps Air Station Iwakuni, Japan, delivered more than 82,000 pounds of food, water, blankets, toiletries and other items to be distributed to earthquake victims.

Defense Support of Civil Authorities, Commonwealth of the Northern Mariana Islands, September–November 2018 
During Fall Patrol 2018, the 31st MEU and CLB-31 provided assistance to the people of CNMI, a U.S. territory, after two devastating typhoons. 
On 10 Sept., Super Typhoon Mangkhut swept across CNMI, causing widespread damage to the islands of Rota and Saipan. During Mangkhut relief efforts, the 31st MEU and CLB-31, partnering with Amphibious Squadron 11, cleared roads and flew 63 air missions to deliver assistance personnel and more than 29,000 pounds of cargo for the people of CNMI. Mangkhut DSCA relief efforts ended on 14 Sept. when the 31st MEU and CLB-31 re-embarked aboard the Wasp and Ashland to continue deployment.

Just over a month later, on 25 October, the second-strongest storm ever to hit U.S. soil, Super Typhoon Yutu, made a direct hit on the islands of Tinian and Saipan. The 31st MEU and CLB-31, which had just returned to Okinawa after completing deployment, received orders to assist relief efforts just days after returning to Camp Hansen. The 31st MEU arrived to support DSCA efforts in aiding local leadership and FEMA on 29 October, taking shelter at the international airport and establishing a command post. A more robust follow-on force arrived aboard the USS Ashland on 3 November, aiding with water purification, route clearance, damage assessments and restoration of municipal utilities. All told, the 31st MEU and CLB-31, which led the multiservice response effort on Tinian, cleared miles of roadway, purified more than 20,000 gallons of drinking water, and helped deliver and assemble more than 150 FEMA-provided shelters, handing control of the DSCA effort to the U.S. Navy Seabees of Naval Mobile Construction Battalion 1 on 14 November.

31st MEU commanding officers

Unit awards
A unit citation or commendation is an award bestowed upon an organization for the action cited. Members of the unit who participated in said actions are allowed to wear on their uniforms the awarded unit citation. The 31st Marine Expeditionary Unit has been presented with the following awards:

See also

Marine Air-Ground Task Force
List of Marine Expeditionary Units
Organization of the United States Marine Corps

References
Notes

Bibliography

Web

31st MEU's official website

31